Mid-State Conference (IHSAA) is a sports conference in central Indiana. Its members consist of 1 school in Hendricks, 3 in Johnson, 2 in Marion, and 2 in Morgan Counties.

Membership 

 Decatur Central played in the Central Suburban Conference 1971-97, and Conference Indiana 1997-2006.

Former Members

Membership timeline

Conference Champions 
Asterisks denote co-champions.

Boys Basketball

Girls Basketball 

Brownsburg and Lawrence Central left the conference before girls' basketball was a Mid-State sport.

Boys Cross Country

Girls Cross Country

Football

Boys Track and Field

Girls Track and Field

Resources 
 IHSAA Conferences
 IHSAA Directory

High school sports conferences and leagues in the United States
Sports competitions in Indianapolis